TJ Sokol Mariánské Hory is a Czech rugby club based in Mariánské Hory, Ostrava. They currently play in the KB První Liga.

History
The club was founded in 1947. On 4 July of that year, they played their first match against a team called Slavia Brno.

In 1949 the club played against CFR Bucharest, their first match against opponents outside Czechoslovakia.

In 1979 they reached the final of the Czechoslovak Cup, losing to Praga Rugby 34-14.

More recently, in 2005, they won the Overton International Festival in Overton, England.

Historical names
 Sokol Vítkovické Železárny (1947–53)
 Baník VŽKG Ostrava (1953–56)
 VŽKG Ostrava (1956–60)
 Lokomotiva Ostrava (1960–97)
 Sokol Mariánské Hory

External links
TJ Sokol Mariánské Hory
 80 let Českého Ragby (80 years of Czech Rugby)

Czech rugby union teams
Rugby clubs established in 1947
Sport in Ostrava
Sokol